Epicaerus is a genus of broad-nosed weevils in the family Curculionidae. There are at least 11 described species in Epicaerus.

Species
 Epicaerus benjamini Pierce, 1913
 Epicaerus formidolosus Boheman, 1842
 Epicaerus imbricatus (Say, 1824) (imbricated snout beetle)
 Epicaerus lasalanus Tanner, 1934
 Epicaerus lepidotus Pierce, 1910
 Epicaerus mexicanus Boheman, 1834 (brown leaf notcher)
 Epicaerus scapalis (Casey, 1895)
 Epicaerus sulcatus Casey, 1888
 Epicaerus texanus Casey, 1888
 Epicaerus uniformus Tanner, 1934
 Epicaerus wickhami Pierce, 1913

References

 Alonso-Zarazaga, Miguel A., and Christopher H. C. Lyal (1999). A World Catalogue of Families and Genera of Curculionoidea (Insecta: Coleoptera) (Excepting Scotylidae and Platypodidae), 315.
 Poole, Robert W., and Patricia Gentili, eds. (1996). "Coleoptera". Nomina Insecta Nearctica: A Check List of the Insects of North America, vol. 1: Coleoptera, Strepsiptera, 41-820.

Further reading

 Arnett, R. H. Jr., M. C. Thomas, P. E. Skelley and J. H. Frank. (eds.). (21 June 2002). American Beetles, Volume II: Polyphaga: Scarabaeoidea through Curculionoidea. CRC Press LLC, Boca Raton, Florida .
 Arnett, Ross H. (2000). American Insects: A Handbook of the Insects of America North of Mexico. CRC Press.
 Richard E. White. (1983). Peterson Field Guides: Beetles. Houghton Mifflin Company.

Entiminae